Tony Colavecchia (born 7 August 1963) is a former collegiate soccer head coach. From 1996 to 2005, he served as the head men's soccer coach at the University of Louisville, where he compiled an 80–101–18 record. He remains the school's winningest coach, and had his best season in 2000, when the squad won 12 games. He was named Conference USA Coach of the Year in 2002, when the Cards posted their best ever conference record at 6–2–3.

From 1988 to 1996, he was the head coach at the University of Southern Indiana, compiling a 68–25–9 record. From 1988 to 1990, he was named Great Lakes Valley Conference Coach of the Year. He was previously an assistant coach at the University of Evansville for 3 years.

He played professional soccer as a midfielder for Lincoln City Football Club. Currently he coaches at the Arizona soccer club SC del Sol.

External links
https://web.archive.org/web/20120318022215/http://www.uoflsports.com/sports/m-soccer/mtt/colavecchia_tony00.html
http://www.uoflsports.com/sports/m-soccer/spec-rel/110305aaa.html

Louisville Cardinals men's soccer coaches
Living people
University of Evansville people
University of Southern Indiana people
1963 births
People from Skegness
Lincoln City F.C. players
Alumni of the University of Gloucestershire
Association football midfielders
English football managers
English footballers
Southern Indiana Screaming Eagles men's soccer coaches